Benjamin Tonsler House is a historic home located at Charlottesville, Virginia. It was built in 1879, and is a two-story, stuccoed frame Late Victorian dwelling with elements of the Italianate and Second Empire styles.  It has a rear wing, high-pitched gable roof, and a projecting corner tower with a mansard roof.

It was listed on the National Register of Historic Places in 1983.  It is located in the Fifeville and Tonsler Neighborhoods Historic District.

References

Houses on the National Register of Historic Places in Virginia
Victorian architecture in Virginia
Houses completed in 1879
Houses in Charlottesville, Virginia
National Register of Historic Places in Charlottesville, Virginia
Historic district contributing properties in Virginia